San Francisco Ballet dances each year at the  War Memorial Opera House, San Francisco, and tours; this is the list of ballets with casts for the 2011 season beginning with the gala, Wednesday, January 26, 2011,  The Nutcracker is danced the year before.

Gala

Wednesday, January 26, 2011

notes for gala 

Black Swan pas de deux  was not listed in the program, but danced by Sofiane Sylve

Program one, January 29 – February 13 Full-length
 Giselle

Program two, Mixed bill
 Symphonic Variations
 RAkU
 Symphony in C

Program three, Mixed bill
 Classical Symphony
 Nanna’s Lied
 Artifact Suite

Program four, Mixed bill
 TRIO
 Winter Dreams
 Theme and Variations

Program five, Full-length
 Coppélia

Program six, Mixed program
 Ghosts
 7 for Eight
 Chroma

Program seven, Mixed program
 Petrouchka
 Underskin
 Number Nine

Program eight, Full-length
 The Little Mermaid

External links 
 

San Francisco Ballet
Lists of ballets by company
Ballet
2011 in San Francisco